The Spanish Cape Mystery is a 1935 American mystery film directed by Lewis D. Collins and starring Donald Cook, Helen Twelvetrees and Berton Churchill. It is based on the novel of the same name featuring the detective Ellery Queen.

Cast

References

Bibliography
 Goble, Alan. The Complete Index to Literary Sources in Film. Walter de Gruyter, 1999.

External links
 

1935 films
1935 mystery films
1930s English-language films
American mystery films
Films directed by Lewis D. Collins
Republic Pictures films
American black-and-white films
Films based on American novels
1930s American films
Ellery Queen films